Pollock House may refer to:

 Pollock House, Oxford, England
 Pollok House, Glasgow, Scotland
Pollock-Krasner House and Study Center, Springs, New York

See also
 Pollock (disambiguation)